Underground education in Poland may refer to:
 Education in Poland during World War II
 Flying University, an underground educational enterprise that operated from 1885 to 1905 and from 1977 to 1981